Maynard Faye Throneberry (June 22, 1931 – April 26, 1999) was an American professional baseball player. A native of Fisherville, Tennessee, he was a backup outfielder in Major League Baseball who played for the Boston Red Sox (1952, 1955–57), Washington Senators (1957–60) and Los Angeles Angels (1961). He was the older brother of Marv Throneberry.

Faye Throneberry's best season probably came in 1959 with the Senators, when he hit a career-high 10 home runs and had 82 hits.

He was claimed on December 14, 1960 by the Angels in the Major League Baseball expansion draft. He played in the franchise's 1961 inaugural season and finished his MLB career with the team.

In an eight-season career, Throneberry posted a .236 batting average (307-for-1,302) with 29 home runs, 137 RBI, 152 runs, 48 doubles, 12 triples, and 23 stolen base in 521 games.

After retiring from baseball, Throneberry became a successful professional trainer of bird dogs. He handled Miller's Miss Knight, a pointer, to victory in the 1973 National Bird Dog Field Trial Championship. He died at age 67 in Memphis, Tennessee.

External links

Baseball Library

1931 births
1999 deaths
Baseball players from Tennessee
Boston Red Sox players
Dallas Rangers players
Hawaii Islanders players
Los Angeles Angels players
Louisville Colonels (minor league) players
Major League Baseball outfielders
Major League Baseball right fielders
Minneapolis Millers (baseball) players
Scranton Miners players
Scranton Red Sox players
Tacoma Giants players
Toronto Maple Leafs (International League) players
Washington Senators (1901–1960) players